Thétis was a 44-gun frigate of the French Navy.

Career 
Commissioned in Toulon on 8 March 1822, Thétis crossed to Brest in late 1822. From December 1822 to October 1823, she cruised the Caribbean before circumnavigating the planet, under Captain Hyacinthe de Bougainville. From 1824 to 1826, she served in the Indian Ocean along with Espérance, again sailing around the globe.

Thétis took part in the Invasion of Algiers in 1830. From 1832 to 1847, she was in various states of commission, and from 1851 she was used as a schoolship for cabin boys. In 1865, she was renamed to Laninon (to free up the name for the armoured corvette Thétis) and used as a coal depot.

References 

Ships built in France
Age of Sail frigates of France
1819 ships